August Brinell (10 October 1849 – 17 November 1925) was a Swedish metallurgical engineer.

Brinell is noted as the creator of a method for quantifying the surface hardness of materials, now known as the Brinell hardness test.  His name is also commemorated in the description of a failure mechanism of material surfaces known as Brinelling.

Biography
Brinell was born in Bringetofta, Nässjö Kommun, Sweden.  He began his career as an Engineer at the Lesjöfors Ironworks and in 1882 became chief engineer at the Fagersta Ironworks.  In 1903 he became Chief Engineer at Jernkontoret, the Swedish Ironmasters' Association.  He remained at that post until 1914.  

Brinell was elected a member of the Royal Swedish Academy of Sciences in 1902, and of the Royal Swedish Academy of Engineering Sciences in 1919. He was awarded the Bessemer Gold Medal of the Iron and Steel Institute in 1907. 

He died of pneumonia in 1925 in Stockholm.

Legacy
Brinell is best known today for the Brinell hardness test, which he proposed in 1900.  In this test a 10-millimetre diameter hardened steel or carbide ball is pushed into the surface of the material being tested, with a 3000 kg imposed load.  The depth to which the ball penetrates the material surface is an indication of the Brinell Hardness Number, which is calculated as follows:

BHN = load in kilograms divided by the spherical area of the indentation in square
millimetres (refer to Brinell scale for method of calculation)

It is a rapid, non-destructive (except at the surface being tested) means of determining the hardness of metals. This area is a function of the ball diameter and the depth of the indentation. With minor variations, his test still remains in wide use.
This method is best for achieving the macro-hardness of material, particularly those materials with heterogenous structure.

External links 

 Complete Dictionary of Scientific Biography
 Svenskt porträttgalleri. XVII. - Stockholm, 1905, Brinell, Johan August

References

Swedish metallurgists
Members of the Royal Swedish Academy of Sciences
Members of the Royal Swedish Academy of Engineering Sciences
1849 births
1925 deaths
Bessemer Gold Medal